is a 1984 Japanese film directed by Masanobu Deme.

Awards and nominations
9th Hochi Film Award 
 Won: Best Actress - Sayuri Yoshinaga

Japan Academy Prize
 Won: Best Actress - Sayuri Yoshinaga

Kinema Junpo Awards
 Won: Best Actress - Sayuri Yoshinaga

Mainichi Film Awards
 Won: Best Actress - Sayuri Yoshinaga

References

External links

1984 films
Japanese drama films
1980s Japanese-language films
Japanese films based on actual events
1980s Japanese films